The 2022 North Carolina Courage season is the team's sixth season as a professional women's soccer team. North Carolina Courage plays in the National Women's Soccer League, the top tier of women's soccer in the United States.

Challenge Cup 

The Challenge Cup is the NWSL's primary league cup tournament. It was first played in 2020 following the cancellation of the regular season due to the COVID-19 pandemic. Angel City and San Diego, new expansion clubs, competed for the first time in the Challenge Cup. In the 2021 cup, North Carolina had failed to advance beyond the group stage. The twelve league teams were divided into three groups, with North Carolina initially competing twice against the other three teams in its group: Gotham, Orlando, and Washington.

Group stage

Divisional standings

Knockout stage

Championship

Regular season 
The 2022 season of the National Women's Soccer League saw 12 teams play 22 matches: one against every other team, with one match at each club's stadium. Three points were awarded for each win, one point per draw, and none for defeats. At the end of the season, the top two teams qualify for first-round byes in the NWSL Playoffs, while four more teams play in an opening playoff round.

Matches

League table

Results summary

Results by matchday

Players 

North Carolina has used a total of 30 players during the 2022 season, and there have been 14 different goal scorers. There have also been three squad members — forward Valérie Gauvin, who was traded to the Houston Dash on August 23, 2022; midfielder Haleigh Stackpole; and goalkeeper Marisa Bova — who have not made a first-team appearance in the campaign.

The team has scored a total of 60 goals in all competitions. The highest scorers have been Debinha with 17 goals, and Diana Ordoñez with 12 goals.

Key

No. = Squad number

Pos = Playing position

Nat. = Nationality

Apps = Appearances

GK = Goalkeeper

DF = Defender

MF = Midfielder

FW = Forward

 = Yellow cards

 = Red cards

Numbers in parentheses denote appearances as substitute. Players with name struck through and marked  left the club during the playing season.

Source:

References 

North Carolina Courage
North Carolina Courage
North Carolina Courage
North Carolina Courage seasons
2022 in North Carolina